Harrison is a census-designated place in Jackson County, Illinois, United States.  Its population was 970 as of the 2010 census.

Demographics

References

Census-designated places in Jackson County, Illinois
Census-designated places in Illinois